Oleh Oleksandrovych Kandyba (8 July 1907 – 9 June 1944), better known by the pen name of Oleh Olzhych, was a Ukrainian poet and political activist. He was forced to emigrate from Ukraine in 1923 due to occupation by the Soviet Russia and lived in Prague, Czechoslovakia. He graduated in 1929 from Charles University with a degree in archaeology. In 1929 he joined the Organization of Ukrainian Nationalists and became head of their cultural and educational branch.

After the split in the OUN in 1938, Olzhych remained loyal to the Andriy Melnyk faction and represented OUN-M in Carpatho-Ukraine as Melnyk's deputy. Olzhych's poetry focused on themes of the Ukrainian struggle for independence. He moved to Kyiv in 1941 and was instrumental in the formation of the Ukrainian National Council.

From 1941 to 1944 he directed the activities of OUN-M in Ukraine. He was arrested by the Gestapo along with other political activists who were seeking of revival of Ukraine and subsequently was executed.

Oleh Olzhych is the son of the famous Ukrainian writer Oleksandr Oles.

References

External links
 Ucrdc.org

1907 births
1944 deaths
Writers from Zhytomyr
People from Zhitomirsky Uyezd
Ukrainian people in the Russian Empire
Charles University alumni
Ukrainian people executed in Nazi concentration camps
Organization of Ukrainian Nationalists politicians
Ukrainian male poets
Ukrainian nationalists
20th-century Ukrainian poets
People who died in Sachsenhausen concentration camp